Zahle is a surname. Notable people with the surname include:

Carl Theodor Zahle (1866–1946), Danish lawyer and politician
Herluf Zahle (1873–1941), Danish barrister
Max Zahle (born 1977), German filmmaker
Natalie Zahle (1827–1913), Danish reformer

Danish-language surnames